The men's 200 metres event at the 2006 World Junior Championships in Athletics was held in Beijing, China, at Chaoyang Sports Centre on 17 and 18 August.

Medalists

Results

Final
18 August
Wind: -1.1 m/s

Semifinals
17 August

Semifinal 1
Wind: -1.0 m/s

Semifinal 2
Wind: -0.9 m/s

Semifinal 3
Wind: -1.5 m/s

Heats
17 August

Heat 1
Wind: -0.2 m/s

Heat 2
Wind: -1.1 m/s

Heat 3
Wind: -0.4 m/s

Heat 4
Wind: -1.5 m/s

Heat 5
Wind: -0.6 m/s

Heat 6
Wind: 0.0 m/s

Heat 7
Wind: -0.8 m/s

Heat 8
Wind: -0.6 m/s

Participation
According to an unofficial count, 59 athletes from 45 countries participated in the event.

References

200 metres
200 metres at the World Athletics U20 Championships